The Canadian Indigenous Nurses Association (CINA) is a non-governmental, non-profit organization. It is an affiliate group of the Canadian Nurses Association. The CINA is the only professional nursing organization for Indigenous peoples in Canada and was formerly known as the Aboriginal Nurses Association of Canada. Ann Thomas Callahan, a Cree Canadian nurse, was involved in its creation, and the association presented her with a Lifetime Achievement Award in 2014.

See also

List of nursing organizations

References

External links
Official website

Nursing organizations in Canada
Organizations established in 1975